Calathusa is a genus of moths in the subfamily Hypeninae of the Erebidae. The genus was erected by Francis Walker in 1858. Many of its species occur in Australia. It was previously included in the subfamily Chloephorinae of the Nolidae.

Species
Listed alphabetically:

References

Hypeninae
Moth genera